Deepcar railway station, originally "Deep Car", is a disused railway station near Deepcar, South Yorkshire, England. The station, situated on the line built by the Sheffield, Ashton-under-Lyne and Manchester Railway, opened on 14 July 1845. The station was located between Oughtibridge and Wortley and was intended to serve the village of Deepcar, near Sheffield, South Yorkshire. In 1899 the route became part of the Great Central Railway main line from London Marylebone to Manchester. 

The station was built with two flanking platforms, the main station building being on the Manchester-bound side with a waiting shelter on the other. In the 1870s a short branch line was constructed to serve the Stocksbridge steel works of Samuel Fox and Company. This line ran from the west end of Deepcar station to a set of sidings, where traffic was exchanged with the Stocksbridge Railway. At the west end of the station, to the rear of the main line platform, there was a short bay known as the Stocksbridge platform from where passenger trains to the station at Stocksbridge (also known as Stocksbridge platform) departed. This service, which commenced in 1877, ceased in 1931.

The station closed to passenger traffic on 15 June 1959.

The line, albeit single track from Woodburn Junction, is still open to serve the steel works, now operated by the speciality steels division of Liberty House Group. Traffic to this location usually runs at night.

References

Dow, George. "Great Central Volume One" (The Progenitors 1813 - 1865) Locomotive Publishing Company, London, 1959.

Disused railway stations in Sheffield
Railway stations in Great Britain opened in 1845
Railway stations in Great Britain closed in 1959
Stocksbridge
Woodhead Line
Former Great Central Railway stations